Juncus hemiendytus is a species of rush known by the common name Herman's dwarf rush. It is native to the western United States, where it grows in moist places, especially areas that are wet in spring, such as vernal pools. This is a very small annual herb forming dense clumps of hair-thin reddish stems no more than about 3 centimeters tall. The tiny, thready leaves surrounding the stems are up to about 2 centimeters long. Each stem usually bears one reddish flower, which is made up of segments 2 or 3 millimeters long curving around the developing fruit.

External links
Jepson Manual Treatment
Photo gallery

hemiendytus
Plants described in 1948
Flora of the Western United States
Flora without expected TNC conservation status